is a sub-kilometre asteroid, classified as a near-Earth object of the Apollo group.

Observation 
 was first observed on 25 July 2019 by Pan-STARRS 1 at Haleakala Observatory, Hawaii, United States.

Orbit and classification 

Close approach in 2019 

Physical characteristics 
Based on its absolute magnitude of 22.874,  is estimated to have a diameter of 71–160 metres using an assumed albedo of 0.05 (carbonaceous) and 0.25 (siliceous) respectively.

See also 
 List of asteroid close approaches to Earth in 2019

Notes

References

External links 
 MPEC 2009-O111 : 2019 OU1, Minor Planet Electronic Circular
 List Of Apollo Minor Planets (by designation), Minor Planet Center
 
 
 

Minor planet object articles (unnumbered)
20190725

20190828